Enayati-ye Pain (also Romanized as ʿEnāyatī-ye Pā’īn and ʿEnāyatī-ye Pāeen) is a village in Abshar Rural District, in the Central District of Shadegan County, Khuzestan Province, Iran. At the 2006 census, its population was 750, in 135 families.

References 

Populated places in Shadegan County